Gary Mitchell is a Northern Irish dramatist.

Gary or Garry Mitchell may also refer to:

People
Gary Mitchell (television presenter), Australian presenter and producer on Sweet and Sour (2000s TV series)
Gary Mitchell (strongman) in 1997 World's Strongest Man
Garry Mitchell, see 2000–01 Motherwell F.C. season
Gary Mitchell (curler) in 1991 Labatt Brier

Fictional characters
 Gary Mitchell (Star Trek), a Star Trek (TOS) character
Gary Mitchell, fictional character in My Dream Is Yours